Empire Asquith was a 7,082 ton cargo ship which was built in 1944. In 1947 she was sold and renamed Brockley Hill. Further name changes were Starcrest in 1951, Argosy in 1957 and Nezihi Ipar in 1960. She was scrapped in 1970.

History

Wartime

Empire Asquith was built by Shipbuilding Corporation Ltd, Newcastle upon Tyne. She was yard number 9, launched on 4 September 1944 and completed in November 1944. She was built for the Ministry of War Transport and managed by R Chapman & Son.

Empire Asquith was a member of a number of convoys during the Second World War.

SC167

Empire Asquith was a member of Convoy SC 167, which departed Halifax, Nova Scotia in mid February 1944 and arrived at Liverpool on 2 March. She was carrying a cargo of lumber bound for the Tyne.

Postwar
In 1946 management of Empire Asquith passed to Counties Ship Management (CSM). She was sold to the Brockley Hill Steamship Co Ltd in 1947, operating under CSM's management, and renamed to replace a previous SS Brockley Hill that had been sunk in 1941. In 1950 she was sold to Vandar Shipping Co Ltd who placed her under the management of Ivanovich & Co Ltd. She was sold to Crest Shipping Co in 1951 and renamed Starcrest, remaining under Ivanovich's management. In 1957, she was sold to the Compagnia Navigazione Phoenix, Panama and renamed Argosy, being sold to the Codemar Compagnia de Empresas Maritimas, Panama the following year. In 1960, she was sold to Ipar Transport Co, Istanbul and renamed Nezihi Ipar. She was laid up in Istanbul in 1962 and scrapped at Haliç in September 1970.

Official number and code letters
Official Numbers were a forerunner to IMO Numbers.

Empire Asquith had the UK Official Number 169187 and used the Code Letters GFJN.

References

1944 ships
Ships built on the River Tyne
Steamships of the United Kingdom
Empire ships
Ministry of War Transport ships
Steamships of the Bahamas
Merchant ships of the Bahamas
Steamships of Liberia
Merchant ships of Liberia
Steamships of Turkey
Cargo ships of Turkey